Thermonectus nigrofasciatus is a species of diving beetle native to the eastern United States. T. nigrofasciatus is distinguished by its black, postmedian transverse blotch on its elytra, hence "nigrofasciatus."

References

Dytiscidae
Beetles of North America
Beetles described in 1838
Taxa named by Charles Nicholas Aubé